Don Hamilton (September 17, 1929 – September 13, 1999) was an American sports shooter. He competed in the 50 metre pistol event at the 1968 Summer Olympics.

References

1929 births
1999 deaths
American male sport shooters
Olympic shooters of the United States
Shooters at the 1968 Summer Olympics
Sportspeople from Boston
Pan American Games medalists in shooting
Pan American Games gold medalists for the United States
Pan American Games silver medalists for the United States
Shooters at the 1967 Pan American Games
20th-century American people